Luigerahu is a small, moraine-based Baltic Sea island that belongs to the country of Estonia.

Luigerahu covers approximately 0.2 hectares and lies half a kilometer off the western coast of the island of Ahelaid. The island is administered by Hiiu County, and along with a number of other islands, makes up the Hiiumaa Islets Landscape Reserve.

See also
List of islands of Estonia

References

External links
Map of the Hiiumaa Islets Landscape Reserve

Estonian islands in the Baltic
Hiiumaa Parish